John Tyler Sundling (born January 18, 1991) is an American former tennis player.

Sundling was raised in Thousand Oaks, California and earned a top five national ranking in junior tennis. He and Daniel Nguyen won the doubles title at the USTA national championships in 2009, subsequently receiving a wildcard into the doubles main draw of the US Open.

A member of two NCAA championship teams as a player with the USC Trojans, Sundling became head coach of the University of San Francisco men's program in 2020, following two seasons as an assistant.

References

External links
 
 

1991 births
Living people
American male tennis players
American tennis coaches
USC Trojans men's tennis players
San Francisco Dons coaches
Tennis people from California
People from Thousand Oaks, California
College tennis coaches in the United States